The Itinera Institute is a Brussels-based independent think-tank that undertakes research that “identifies and promotes roads for policy reform towards sustained economic growth and social protection, for Belgium and its regions.” It was founded in 2006 by Professor .

Scholars
As of mid-2009, Itinera Institute resident scholars include Marc De Vos (Director), Johan Albrecht, Jean Hindriks and François Daue. Many other experts and specialists collaborate regularly on Itinera’s reports and publications.

Themes & Publications 

Itinera has nine main research programs including:
 Ageing and Pensions 
 Economy 
 Education & Innovation 
 Employment 
 Energy & Environment 
 Government & Taxation 
 Healthcare 
 Migration & Integration 
 Poverty & Inequality 

Some important reports have been published on those fields such as “The future of healthcare: Diagnostic and remedies”, “From job security to employment security on the Belgian labour market” and “Beyond Copernicus: From confusion to consensus?”

Next to the reports, Itinera regularly published short papers on Belgian economic and social challenges.

Criticisms

Itinera calls itself a fully independent institute, not financed by political parties, lobby groups or government bodies, and claims its only revenue sources come from private donators, but critics have questioned these claims of independence made by Itinera. Dirk van der Maelen notes that the formation of the organisation was funded by leaders of the business community, who have connections to Open VLD and LLD; and gives explicit mention to Luc Verelst, Bart Verhaeghe, Christian Leysen and Nicolas Saverys, According to Van der Maelen, Itinera has not come forward to answer questions regarding financing since their foundation. Political philosopher Thomas Decreus has called Itinera "a neo-liberal lobby group with political ambitions".

References

External links
 

2006 establishments in Belgium
Think tanks established in 2006
Political and economic think tanks based in the European Union
Think tanks based in Belgium